Camuño is one of 28 parishes (administrative divisions) in Salas, a municipality within the province and autonomous community of Asturias, in northern Spain.

Villages
Buenavista (Bonavista) 
Carbajal (La Carbayal) 
Cardús 
Casamayor 
El Caleyo (El Caleyu)
Fenigonte 
La Viesca

References

Parishes in Salas